This is a list of top international male singles tennis players, both past and present.

It includes players who have met one or more of the following criteria in singles:

 Officially ranked among the top 25 players by the Association of Tennis Professionals (since 1973)
 Ranked among the top 10 by an expert (e.g. A. Wallis Myers) before 1973
 Reached the quarterfinals of a Grand Slam tournament
 Reached the finals of year-end championships
 Won a medal at the Olympic Games

Players who have won at least one Grand Slam singles title or have been ranked world no. 1 in singles are in bold. Players who are still active on the tour are in italics.

List

 Active players shown in italics
{|class="sortable wikitable"
!width="160"|Name!!Birth!!Death!!Nationality!!!!Rank!!Highest inclusion criteria
|- id=A
|||1920||2006|||| ||  || 1949 French Championships quarterfinalist
|-
|||1982||–|| Argentina|| || 20 || Ranking in 2006
|-
|||1921||2010|| Hungary|| || || 1947 French Championships quarterfinalist
|-
|||1970||–|||| 2011 || 1 || Winner of 8 Grand Slam titles and a career Golden Grand Slam completed in 1999 + 1 Olympic gold medal → 1992 Wimbledon champion • 1994/1999 US Open champion • 1995/2000/2001/2003 Australian Open champion • 1999 French Open champion • 1996 Olympic gold medalist • 1990 ATP Tour World Championships winner • ranking world no. 1 for 101 weeks
|-
|||1964||–||  Haiti|| || 22 || 1989 French Open quarterfinalist • ranking in 1989
|-
|||1962||–|||| || 7 || Ranking in 1984
|-
|||1988||–|||| || 9 || Ranking in 2020 • 2016 Olympics quarterfinals • 2019 Wimbledon semifinalist
|-
|||1973||–|||| || 25 || Ranking in 2000
|-
|||2003||–|||| || 1 || 2022 U.S. Open champion • 2022 French Open quarterfinalist • Ranking in 2022
|-
|||1880||1969|| United States|| 1961 || || Winner of 1 Grand Slam title → 1908 Australasian Championships winner 
|-
|||1951||–|| Australia|| || 8 || 1977 (December) Australian Open semifinalist • ranking in 1975
|-
|||1904||1977|| United States|| 1963 || 4 || Winner of 1 Grand Slam title → 1935 United States champion, 1934 finalist • 1930 Wimbledon finalist • ranking in 1932 and 1935
|-
|||1985||–|||| || 9 || 2008/2010/2012 French Open quarterfinalist •2013 Australian Open quarterfinalist• ranking in 2011
|-
|||1895||1984|| Spain|| 1977 || 5 || 1921 Wimbledon semifinalist • rated world no. 5 in 1927
|-
|||1920||1997|| Philippines|| || || 1952, 1953 French Championships quarterfinalist
|-
|||1953||–|||| || 16 || 1973 and 1981 Wimbledon quarterfinalist • 1973 and 1974 U.S. Open quarterfinalist • ranking in 1980
|-
|||1984||–|||| || 7 || 2004 Wimbledon semifinalist • ranking in 2006
|-
|||1894||1973|| Australia|| 2013 || 3 || Winner of 3 Grand Slam titles → 1922, 1924 and 1925 Australasian champion • rated world no. 3 in 1924 and 1925
|-
|||1986||–|| South Africa|| || 5 || 2018 Wimbledon finalist • 2017 US Open finalist • ranking in 2018
|-
|||1935||–|| Australia|| 2000 || 2 || Winner of 1 Grand Slam title → 1957 United States champion • rated amateur world no. 2 in 1957 and 1958
|-
|||1983||–|||| || 18 || 2007 French Open quarterfinalist • ranking in 2008
|-
|||1952||–|||| || || 1975 French Open quarterfinalist
|-
|||1963||–|||| || 23 || Ranking in 1986
|-
|||1963||–|||| || 12 || 1984 Wimbledon quarterfinalist • Ranking in 1986

|-
|||1973||–|||| || 22 || 1997 and 1998 French Open quarterfinalist • 2000 and 2004 Australian Open quarterfinalist • ranking in 2001
|-
|||1964||–|||| || 5 || 1983 U.S. Open semifinalist • ranking in 1984
|-
|||1964||–|||| || 23 || 1992 Olympic silver medalist • ranking in 1991
|-
|||1917||1986|| Hungary|| || || Winner of 1 Grand Slam title → 1947 French champion • 1948 Wimbledon semifinalist
|-
|||1943||1993|||| 1985 || 2 || Winner of 3 Grand Slam titles → 1968 U.S. Open champion • 1970 Australian Open champion • 1975 Wimbledon champion • ranking in 1975
|-
|||2000||–|||| || 6 || 2021 U.S. Open semifinalist • 2022 Australian Open quarterfinalist • 2021 Wimbledon quarterfinalist • Ranking in 2022 
|-
|||1906||2000|| Great Britain|| 1997 || 2 || 1932 and 1938 Wimbledon finalist • 1937 French finalist • amateur ranking in 1931
|-
|||1932||–|||| || 5 || 1958 and 1960 French finalist • ranking in 1958
|- id=B
|||1872||1929|| Great Britain|| 2013 || || Winner of 3 Grand Slam titles → 1891, 1892 and 1895 Wimbledon champion, 1893, 1894 and 1896 runner-up
|-
|||1985||–|||| || 8 || 2006 Australian Open finalist • 2006 Wimbledon semifinalist • ranking in 2006
|-
|||1953||–|||| || 7 || 1977 U.S. Open semifinalist • 1978 French Open semifinalist • ranking in 1978
|-
|||1873||1943|| Great Britain|| || || 1908, 1909 and 1911 Wimbledon finalist • 1908 Olympic gold medalist 
|-
|||1941||–|||| || || Ranked a world top-20 player for 1971
|-
|||1992||–|| Georgia|| || 16 || Ranking in 2019
|-
|||1879||1944|| Great Britain|| || || 1912 Australasian championships finalist
|-
|||1967||–|| West Germany/Germany ||  2003 || 1 || Winner of 6 Grand Slam titles → 1985/1986/1989 Wimbledon champion • 1989 U.S. Open champion • 1991/1996 Australian Open champion • 1988 Masters Grand Prix champion; 1992/1995 ATP Tour World champion • ranking world no. 1 for 12 weeks in 1991
|-
|||1885||1949|||| 1969 || || 1906 U.S. Championship finalist
|-
|||1945||–|||| || || 1968 Australian Championships quarterfinalist
|-
|||1987||–|| Brazil|| || 21 || Ranking in 2010
|-
|||1959||–|| Argentina|| || 21 || Ranking in 1987
|-
|||1981||–|||| || 25 || 2006 French Open quarterfinalist • ranking in 2014
|-
|||1973||–|||| || 7 || 1994 French Open finalist • ranking in 1994
|-
|||1985||–|| Czech Republic|| || 4 || 2010 Wimbledon finalist • 2011 Tour Finals semifinalist • ranking in 2015
|-
|||1925||2008|| Sweden|| || || 1946/1948/1951 Wimbledon quarterfinalist
|-
|||1966||–|||| || 7 || 1989 U.S. Open quarterfinalist • 1989 French Open quarterfinalist • ranking in 1990
|-
|||1967||–|| Sweden|| || || 1993 Australian Open quarterfinalist
|-
|||1914||1994|||| || || Winner of 1 Grand Slam title → 1946 French Championships champion
|-
|||1996||–|| Italy|| || 6 || 2021 Wimbledon finalist • 2019 U.S. Open semifinalist • Ranking in 2022
|-
|||1951||–|| Italy|| || 12 || 1973 French Open quarterfinalist • ranking in 1973
|-
|||1909||1980|| Great Britain|| || || 1939 French Championships quarterfinalist
|-
|||1972||–|| Sweden|| || 4 || 1997 U.S. Open semifinalist • 2006 Wimbledon semifinalist • ranking in 1997
|-
|||1969||–|| Zimbabwe|| || 22 || 1995 U.S. Open quarterfinalist • 2000 Wimbledon quarterfinalist • ranking in 1996
|-
|||1979||–|||| || 4 || 2005/2006 U.S. Open quarterfinalist • 2008 Australian Open quarterfinalist • 2006 Tour Finals finalist • ranking in 2006
|-
|||1976||–|||| || || 1997 French Open quarterfinalist
|-
|||1969||–|||| || 12 || Ranking in 1996
|-
|||1956||–|| Sweden|| 1987 || 1 || Winner of 11 Grand Slam titles → 1974/1975/1978/1979/1980/1981 French Open champion • 1976/1977/1978/1979/1980 Wimbledon champion • 1979/1980 Masters Grand Prix champion • ranking world no. 1 for 109 weeks → for 1 week in 1977, 32 in 1979, 49 in 1980 and 27 in 1981
|-
|||1898||1994|||| 1976 || 2 || Winner of 5 Grand Slam titles → 1924 and 1931 French champion • 1924 and 1926 Wimbledon champion • 1928 Australian champion • ranking in 1926
|-
|||1949||–|||| || 25 || Ranking in 1977
|-
|||1943||–|| Australia|| || || Winner of 1 Grand Slam title → 1968 Australian champion
|-
|||1908||2003|||| || || 1931 French Championships finalist, 1928 Wimbledon semifinalist
|-
|||1930||2011|| Belgium|| || || 1958 French Championships semifinalist
|-
|||1864||1939|| United States|| || || 1885 U.S. Championships finalist
|-
|||1918||1999|| Australia|| 1984 || 2 || Winner of 2 Grand Slam titles → 1939 and 1946 Australian champion • ranking in 1939
|-
|||1877||1968|| Australia|| 1977 || || Winner of 3 Grand Slam titles → 1907 and 1914 Wimbledon champion • 1911 Australasian champion
|-
|||1924||–|| Great Britain|| || 3 || 1946 Wimbledon finalist • amateur ranking in 1946
|-
|||1922||2011|||| || || 1946 United States finalist • 1947 Wimbledon finalist
|-
|||1971||–|||| || 3 || Winner of 2 Grand Slam titles → 1993/1994 French Open champion • 1996 Olympic silver medalist • ranking in 1994
|-
|||1940||–|| || 2005|| 5 || 1960 U.S. National semifinalist • ranking in 1960
|-
|||1915||2000|||| 1964 || 1 || Winner of 6 Grand Slam titles → 1937 and 1938 Wimbledon champion • 1937 and 1938 United States champion • 1938 French champion • 1938 Australian champion • rated amateur world no. 1 for 2 years, 1937 through 1938
|-
|||1991||–|||| || 10 || Ranking in 2017 • 2017/2020 U.S. Open semifinalist • 2021 Olympic bronze medalist
|- id=C
|||1965||–|||| || 22 || Ranking in 1989 • 1988 U.S. Open semifinalist 
|-
|||1871||1953|| United States|| 1955 || || Winner of 3 Grand Slam titles → 1890, 1891 and 1892 United States champion 
|-
|||1976||–|||| || 16 || Ranking in 2003
|-
|||1968||–|||| || 18 || Ranking in 1992
|-
|||1963||–|||| || 21 || Ranking in 1985
|-
|||1977||–|||| || 8 || Ranking in 2005 ◌ 2002/2005/2007 French Open quarterfinalist
|-
|||1970||–|||| || || 1991 Australian Open quarterfinalist
|-
|||1968||–|||| || 6 || Ranking in 1988
|-
|||1951||–|||| || 13 || Ranking in 1976 ◌ 1974 Australian Open semifinalist 
|-
|||1965||–|||| || 4 || Winner of 1 Grand Slam title → 1987 Wimbledon champion • ranking in 1988
|-
|||1992||–|| Italy|| || 16 || 2018 French Open semifinalist • ranking in 2019
|-
|||1917||1965|| Czechoslovakia|| || || 1937, 1938 French Championships quarterfinalist • 1938 Wimbledon quarterfinalist
|-
|||1875||1955|||| 1961 || || 1894 United States semifinalist 
|-
|||1966||–|||| || || 1990 French Open quarterfinalist • 1991 Wimbledon quarterfinalist
|-
|||1972||–|||| 2008 || 2 || Winner of 1 Grand Slam title → 1989 French Open champion • ranking in 1996
|-
|||1987||–|||| || 25 || 2013 Australian Open quarterfinalist • ranking in 2013
|-
|||1979||–|||| || 15 || 2004/2011 French Open quarterfinalist • 2007 US Open quarterfinalist • ranking in 2004
|-
|||1970||–|| Soviet Union/|| || 13 || 1990 Australian Open quarterfinalist • 1990 U.S. Open quarterfinalist • ranking in 1991
|-
|||1966||–|| Soviet Union/|| || 9 || 1989 French Open semifinalist • ranking in 1991
|-
|||1850||1903|| Great Britain|| || || 1884 Wimbledon semifinalist
|-
|||1988||–||  || || 3 || 2014 U.S. Open champion • 2017 Wimbledon finalist • 2018 Australian Open finalist • 2022 French open semifinalist • 2010 Australian Open semifinalist • ranking in 2018
|-
|||1968||–|||| || 18 || Ranking in 1992
|-
|||1977||–|||| || 10 || 2001 Australian Open finalist • ranking in 2001
|-
|||1958||–|||| || 4 || 1981 and 1982 French Open semifinalist • ranking in 1981
|-
|||1881||1962|| United States|| 1956 || || Winner of 1 Grand Slam title → 1906 United States champion
|-
|||1901||1987|||| 1976 || 1 || Winner of 7 Grand Slam titles → 1922, 1926, 1928, 1930 and 1932 French champion • 1927 and 1929 Wimbledon champion • 1928 United States champion • rated world no. 1 amateur for 3 years, 1928 through 1930 
|-
|||1952||–|||| 1998 || 1 || Winner of 8 Grand Slam titles → 1974 Australian Open champion, 1975 finalist • 1974 and 1982 Wimbledon champion • 1974, 1976, 1978, 1982 and 1983 U.S. Open champion • 1977 Masters Grand Prix champion • ranking world no. 1 for 268 weeks → 22 weeks in 1974, 52 weeks in 1975, 52 weeks in 1976, 51 weeks in 1977, 52 weeks in 1978, 22 weeks in 1979, 8 weeks in 1982 and 9 weeks in 1983
|-
|||1913||2004|| United States|| || || 1939 Wimbledon finalist 
|-
|||1936||2020|||| 1991 || 1 || Winner of 4 Grand Slam titles → 1957 and 1958 Australian champion • 1958 Wimbledon champion • 1958 United States champion  •  amateur ranking no. 1 for 1957 and 1958
|-
|||1946||–|||| || || 1971 and 1972 Australian Open quarterfinalist
|-
|||1944||–|||| || || 1974 French Open quarterfinalist
|-
|||1982||–|||| || 3 || 2004 French Open finalist • ranking in 2004
|-
|||1996||–|||| || 12 || 2020 US Open quarterfinalist • ranking in 2018
|-
|||1974||–|||| || 2 || 1998/2001 French Open finalist • 1998 Masters champion • ranking in 1999
|-
|||1975||–|||| || 6 || Winner of 1 Grand Slam title → 2002 French Open champion • ranking in 2002
|-
|||1968||–|||| || 10 || Ranking in 1992
|-
|||1970||–|||| 2005 || 1 || Winner of 4 Grand Slam titles → 1991 and 1992 French Open champion • 1992 and 1993 Australian Open champion • ranking world no. 1 for 58 weeks in 1992
|-
|||1943||–|| Great Britain|| || 13 || 1971 Australian Open quarterfinalist • ranking in 1977
|-
|||1909||1976||/ Germany|| 1977 || || Winner of 2 Grand Slam titles → 1934/1936 French champion, 1935 finalist • 1935/1936/1937 Wimbledon finalist • 1937 U.S. finalist
|-
|||1908||1991|| || 1979 || 1 || Winner of 6 Grand slam titles → 1931, 1932, 1933 and 1935 Australian champion • 1933 French champion • 1933 Wimbledon champion • amateur ranking, 1933
|-
|||1944||–|||| || || 1970 Australian Open finalist
|-
|||1916||1977|| Italy|| || || 1947, 1948 and 1949 French Championships quarterfinalist
|-
|||1986||–|| Uruguay|| || 19 || Ranking in 2016
|-
|||1958||–|| South Africa/|| || 5 || 1984 Australian Open finalist • 1985 Wimbledon finalist • ranking in 1985
|- id=D
|||1928||2008|| Sweden|| 2007 || || Winner of 1 Grand slam title → 1957 French champion
|-
|||1879||1945|||| 1956 || || 1898 United States finalist
|-
|||1962||–|||| || 11 || 1984 Australian Open quarterfinalist • ranking in 1985
|-
|||1970||–|| Argentina|| || || 1991 French Open quarterfinalist
|-
|||1981||–|| Russia|| || 3 || 2005/2007 French Open semifinalist • 2006/2007 U.S. Open semifinalist • 2009 Tour Finals champion • ranking in 2006
|-
|||1882||1978|||| || || 1911, 1912 Wimbledon semifinalist • 1906 Olympic gold medalist 
|-
|||1988||–|| Argentina|| || 3 || Winner of 1 Grand Slam title → 2009 U.S. Open champion • 2009 Tour finals finalist • 2016 Olympics silver medalist • ranking in 2018
|-
|||1999||–|| Australia|| || 18 || 2020 US Open quarterfinalist • ranking in 2019
|-
|||1950||–|| Australia|| || 17 || 1974 Australian Open finalist • ranking in 1977
|-
|||1981||–|||| || 21 || Ranking in 2005
|-
|||1956||–|||| || 12 || 1981 and 1982 Australian Open finalist • ranking in 1983
|-
|||1917||2002|||| || || 1937 French Championships semifinalist
|-
|||1972||–|| Belgium|| || || 1997 French Open semifinalist
|-
|||1944||–|| Australia|| || || 1979 Australian Open semifinalist
|-
|||1951||–|||| || 5 || 1975 and 1976 French Open semifinalist • ranking in 1978
|-
|||1959||–|||| || || 1983 U.S. Open quarterfinalist
|-
|||1942||–|| South Africa|| || || 1965 Wimbledon quarterfinalist
|-
|||1991||–|| Bulgaria|| || 3 || 2014 Wimbledon semifinalist • 2017 Australian Open semifinalist • 2019 US Open semifinalist • ranking in 2017 • 2017 Tour Finals champion
|-
|||1873||1939|| Great Britain|| || || 1901, 1911 Wimbledon finalist
|-
|||1979||–|||| || || 2000 Olympic bronze medalist
|-
|||1987||–|| Serbia|| || 1|| Winner of 21 Grand Slam titles including a double Career Grand Slam in 2016 and 2021 → 2008/2011/2012/2013/2015/2016/2019/2020/2021 Australian Open champion (9) • 2011/2014/2015/2018/2019/2021/2022 Wimbledon champion (7) • 2011/2015/2018 U.S. Open champion (3) • 2016/2021 French Open champion (2) • 2008/12/13/14/15/22 Tour finals champion (6) • 2008 Olympic  bronze medalist • ranking world no. 1 at a record of 373 weeks (2011–2022)
|-
|||1908||1978|||| 1962 || || 1930 United States champion 
|-
|||1875||1919|| Great Britain|| 1980 || || Winner of 6 Grand Slam titles and 1 Olympic gold medal → 1902, 1903, 1904, 1905 and 1906 Wimbledon champion • 1903 United States champion • 1900 Olympic gold medalist
|-
|||1872||1910|| Great Britain|| 1980 || || Winner of 4 Grand Slam titles → 1897, 1898, 1899 and 1900 Wimbledon champion • 1902 United States runner-up
|-
|||1988||–|| Ukraine|| || 13 || 2011 Australian Open quarterfinalist • ranking in 2012
|-
|||1926||2006|||| || || 1950 French Championships quarterfinalist
|-
|||1970||–|| Czech Republic|| || || 1999 U.S. Open quarterfinalist
|-
|||1879||1961|| Australia|| || || 1913 Wimbledon finalist
|-
|||1975||–|||| || || 1994 French Open quarterfinalist
|-
|||1958||2013|| Australia|| || || 1975 Australian Open quarterfinalist
|-
|||1921||2001||// Czechoslovakia/Egypt|| 1983 || || Winner of 3 Grand Slam titles → 1951 and 1952 French champion • 1954 Wimbledon champion
|-
|||1941||–|| South Africa|| 2013 || 13 || 1968 U.S. Open quarterfinalist • 1969 Wimbledon quarterfinalist • 1971 Australian Open quarterfinalist • ranking in 1974
|-
|||1952||–|| Great Britain|| || || 1977 (December) Australian Open quarterfinalist
|-
|||1954||–|||| || 14 || 1979 Wimbledon semifinalist • ranking in 1980
|-
|||1852||1917|||| 1955 || || 1883 U.S. Championship finalist
|- id=E
|||1867||1920|| Great Britain|| || || 1895, 1896, 1897 Wimbledon finalist • 1897(Ch) U.S. Championships finalist • 1908 Olympic bronze medalist
|-
|||1966||–|| Sweden|| 2004 || 1|| Winner of 6 Grand Slam titles → 1985 and 1987 Australian Open champion • 1988 and 1990 Wimbledon champion • 1991 and 1992 U.S. Open champion • 1989 Masters Grand Prix champion • ranking no. 1 for 72 weeks → 21 weeks in 1990, 40 in 1991 and 11 in 1992
|-
|||1954||–|| Australia|| || 15 || Winner of 1 Grand slam title → 1976 Australian Open champion • ranking in 1982
|-
|||1995||–|| Great Britain|| || 14 || 2018 Australian Open semifinalist • ranking in 2018
|-
|||1971||–|| Morocco|| || 14 || 2000 and 2003 Australian Open quarterfinalist • 2002 and 2003 U.S. Open quarterfinalist • ranking in 2003
|-
|||1947||–|| Egypt|| || || 1974 Wimbledon quarterfinalist
|-
|||1970||–|| Netherlands|| || 19 || 1995 Australian Open quarterfinalist, 1995 Wimbledon quarterfinalist • ranking in 1995.
|-
|||1936||–|| Australia|| 1982 || 1|| Winner of 12 Grand Slam titles → 1961, 1963, 1965, 1966 and 1967 Australian champion • 1961 and 1964 United States champion • 1963 and 1967 French champion • 1964 and 1965 Wimbledon champion • ranking world no. 1 amateur for two years, 1964 and 1965
|-
|||1974||–|| Sweden|| || 4 || 1999 Australian Open finalist, 1996 quarterfinalist • 2001 Wimbledon quarterfinalist • ranking in 1999
|-
|||1976||–|||| || 17 || 1998 Australian Open semifinalist • ranking in 2000
|-
|||1857||1916|| Great Britain || || || 1878 Wimbledon All Comers finalist
|-
|||1990||–|| Great Britain|| || 22 || Ranking in 2021
|-
|||1961||–|||| || || 1987 Australian Open quarterfinalist
|- id=F
|||1948||–|||| || 24 || Ranking in 1973
|-
|||1926||–|||| 1974 || || Winner of 1 Grand Slam title → 1948 Wimbledon champion
|-
|||1981||–|||| || 1 || Winner of 20 Grand Slam titles and a career Grand Slam completed in 2009 ◌ 2003/2004/2005/2006/2007/2009/2012/2017 Wimbledon champion (8) • 2004/2006/2007/2010/2017/2018 Australian Open champion (6) • 2004/2005/2006/2007/2008 U.S. Open champion (5) • 2009 French Open champion • 2003/2004/2006/2007/2010/2011 Tour Finals champion (6) • 2012 Olympics silver medalist ◌ Ranking: world no. 1 for 310 weeks (2004–2018) of which 237 consecutive (also a record) (2004–2008)
|-
|||1951||–|| Austria|| || || 1978 Australian Open quarterfinalist
|-
|||1971||–||/ South Africa|| || 6 || 1992 and 2003 Australian Open semifinalist • 1992 Olympic silver medalists • ranking in 1995
|-
|||1982||–|||| || 3 || 2013 French Open finalist  • 2007 Tour Finals finalist • ranking in 2013
|-
|||1980||–|||| || 1|| Winner of 1 Grand Slam title → 2003 French Open champion • 2002 Tour Finals finalist, 2001 semifinalist • ranking world no. 1 for 8 weeks, in 2003
|-
|||1952||–|||| || 10 || 1977 and 1980 French Open quarterfinalist • 1980 Wimbledon quarterfinalist • 1980 U.S. Open quarterfinalist  • ranking in 1977
|-
|||1967||–|| Uruguay|| || || 1999 French Open quarterfinalist
|-
|||1946||–|| Chile|| || 14 || 1975 U.S. Open quarterfinalist • ranking in 1974
|-
|||1981||–|||| || 7 || 2007 Australian Open quarterfinalist • 2008 U.S. Open quarterfinalist • 2011 Wimbledon quarterfinalist • 2004 Olympic single silver medalist • ranking in 2011
|-
|||1960||–|| Australia|| || 25 || Ranking in 1988 
|-
|||1928||1980|||| || 5 || 1950 United States finalist • 1957 French finalist • ranking in 1957
|-
|||1955||–|||| || 8 || 1980 Wimbledon quarterfinalist • ranking in 1980
|-
|||1987||–|||| || 9 || 2011 French Open quarterfinalist • ranking in 2019
|-
|||1934||2020|| South Africa|| || || 1962 United States quarterfinalist
|-
|||1965||–|||| || 4 || 1991 and 1993 Australian Open quarterfinalist • 1991, 1992 and 1994 Wimbledon quarterfinalist  • ranking in 1991
|-
|||1947||–|| Yugoslavia|| || 8 || 1970 French Open finalist   • ranking in 1991
|-
|||1933||–|| Australia|| 1984 || 1 || Winner of 3 Grand Slam titles → 1959 and 1960 United States champion • 1960 Wimbledon champion  • amateur No. 1 ranking, 1959 and 1960
|-
|||1952||–|| Australia|| || || 1979 Australian Open quarterfinalist
|-
|||1997||–|||| || 7 || 2022 Wimbledon quarterfinalist • 2022 Tour Finals semifinalist • Ranking in 2023
|-
|||1942||2020|||| || || 1971 French Open semifinalist
|-
|||1884||1962|| Germany||  || || 1914 Wimbledon finalist • 1908 Olympic silver medalist 
|-
|||1970||–|| Australia|| || 24 || Ranking in 1990
|-
|||1970||–|| Italy|| || 19 || 1995 French Open quarterfinalist • ranking in 1996
|- id=G
|||1977||–|||| || 14 || 2004 Wimbledon quarterfinalist • ranking in 2001
|-
|||1983||–|| Spain|| || 23 || Ranking in 2011
|-
|||1996||–|| Chile|| || 17 || 2022 Wimbledon quarterfinalist • Ranking in 2021
|-
|||1898||1971|| United States|| || || 1919, 1920 Wimbledon semifinalist 
|-
|||1986||–|||| || 7 || 2007 and 2015 Wimbledon semifinalist • 2013 US Open semifinalist • ranking in 2007 
|-
|||1973||–|| Italy|| || 18 || Ranking in 1995
|-
|||1978||–|| Argentina|| || 5 || Winner of 1 Grand Slam title → 2004 French Open champion • 2005 Tour Finals semifinalist • ranking in 2005
|-
|||1954||1994|||| || 3 || Winner of 1 Grand Slam title → 1977(December) Australian Open champion • 1979 and 1981 Masters Grand Prix finalist • ranking in 1978 
|-
|||1934||–|||| || || 1955 U.S. Championships quarterfinalist
|-
|||1963||–|||| || || 1982 Australian Open quarterfinalist
|-
|||1949||–|| Australia|| || 16 || Ranking in 1974 ◌ 1977(December) Australian Open semifinalist
|-
|||1982||–|||| || 15 || Ranking in 2005 ◌ 2005 U.S. Open semifinalist
|-
|||1938||2019|| Spain|| 2009 || 10 || Winner of one Grand Slam titles → 1972 French champion  • ranking amateur in 1969 
|-
|||1942||–||/ Spain|| || || 1968 Australian Championships finalist – 1975 Masters Grand Prix champion, partnering Manuel Orantes
|-
|||1958||–|||| || || 1982 Australian Open quarterfinalist
|-
|||1961||–|||| || 4 || Ranking in 1990 ◌ 1987 U.S. Open quarterfinalist • 1990 Wimbledon quarterfinalist • 1988 Olympics bronze medalist
|-
|||1956||–|| Chile|| || 12 || Ranking in 1980 ◌ 1978/1979/1980 French Open quarterfinalist
|-
|||1958||–|| Israel|| || 22 || Ranking in 1982 ◌ 1981 Australian Open quarterfinalist
|-
|||1860||1939|| United States||  || || 1881 U.S. Championships finalist
|-
|||1890||1951|||| || || 1912 Wimbledon finalist • 1912 Olympic gold medalist 
|-
|||1990||–|| Belgium|| || 7 || 2016 French Open quarterfinalist • 2017 Australian Open quarterfinalist • 2019 Wimbledon quarterfinalist • 2017 Tour Finals finalist • ranking in 2017
|-
|||1963||–|||| || || 1989 Wimbledon quarterfinalist
|-
|||1973||2017|||| || 22 || Ranking in 1999
|-
|||1960||–|| Ecuador|| || 4  || Winner of 1 Grand Slam title → 1990 French Open champion, 1984, 1986 and 1987 quarterfinalist • 1984 Wimbledon quarterfinalist • 1984 U.S. Open quarterfinalist • ranking in 1990
|-
|||1928||1995|||| 1968 || || Winner of 2 Grand Slam titles → 1948 and 1949 United States champion • 1968 French Open semifinalist • 1968 U.S. Open quarterfinalist • rated world no. 1 for 8 years, 1952, 1954, 1955, 1956, 1957, 1958, 1959 and (as co-no.1) 1960
|-
|||1980||–|| Chile|| || 5 || 2007 Australian Open finalist • 2008 Olympic silver medalist, 2004 bronze medalist • ranking in 2007 
|-
|||1853||1909|| Ireland|| || || 1879 Wimbledon finalist
|-
|||1868||1928|| Great Britain|| 2006 || || Winner of 3 Grand Slam titles → 1900, 1901 and 1909 Wimbledon champion • 1908 Olympic gold medallist 
|-
|
|1850||1906|| Great Britain|| || || Winner of 1 Grand Slam title → 1877 Wimbledon champion, 1878 finalist
|-
|||1946||–|||| || 8 || 1971 Wimbledon semifinalist • 1972 U.S. Open semifinalist • 1973 French Open semifinalist • ranking in 1973
|-
|||1952||–|||| || 3 || 1977 French Open finalist • ranking in 1977
|-
|||1948||–|||| || || 1970 French Open semifinalist
|-
|||1943||–|||| || 7 || 1967 United States finalist • ranking in 1968 
|-
|||1910||1986|||| 1972 || 6 || 1935 U.S. Open semifinalist • ranking in 1937
|-
|||1903||1959|| Great Britain|| || || Winner of 1 Grand Slam title → 1929 Australian champion
|-
|||1920||2006|||| || || 1942, 1943, 1944, and 1945 U.S. National Championships quarterfinalist
|-
|||1860||1930|| Great Britain|| || || Finalist in 1884 Wimbledon Championships – Gentlemen's singles
|-
|||1978||–|||| || 4 || 2001 Australian Open semifinalist • 2001 French Open semifinalist • 2003 and 2004 Wimbledon semifinalist • 2001 Tennis Masters Cup finalist • winner of 1 ATP Masters Series event • ranking in 2002
|-
|||1988||–|| Latvia|| || 10  || 2014 French Open semifinalist• ranking in 2014
|-
|||1951||1996|||| || 15 || 1979 Wimbledon quarterfinalist • ranking in 1979
|-
|||1951||–|||| || || 1982 U.S. Open quarterfinalist
|-
|||1931||2000|| Hungary|| || || 1966 French finalist, 1971 quarterfinalist
|-
|||1962||–|| Sweden|| || 25 || 1989 Australian Open semifinalist • ranking in 1985
|-
|||1959||–|| Switzerland|| || 22 || 1985 Wimbledon quarterfinalist • 1985 U.S. Open quarterfinalist • ranking in 1986
|-
|||1967||–|| Sweden|| || 10 || 1994 Australian Open quarterfinalist • ranking in 1991
|- id=H
|||1966||–|| Netherlands|| || 18 || 1991 U.S. Open quarterfinalist • ranking in 1995 
|-
|||1978||–|||| || 2 || 2000 Olympic silver medalist • 1999/2002/2007 Australian Open semifinalist • 2009 Wimbledon semifinalist • ranking in 2002
|-
|||1878||1937|| United States|| 1961 || || 1906 United  quarterfinalist
|-
|||1855||1946|| Great Britain|| || || Winner of 1 Grand Slam title → 1878 Wimbledon champion, 1879 runner-up
|-
|||1872||1932|| United States|| || || 1892 U.S. Championships semifinalist
|-
|||1867||1934|| United States|| || || 1891 U.S. Championships semifinalist 
|-
|||1864||1943|| Ireland|| || || Winner of 1 Grand Slam title → 1890 Wimbledon champion, 1889 semifinalist 
|-
|||1981||–|| Romania|| || || 2005 French Open quarterfinalist
|-
|||1915||1996|| Great Britain||  || || 1937 French Championships quarterfinalist, 1937 U.S. Championships quarterfinalist  
|-
|||1961||–|||| || || 1982 U.S. Open quarterfinalist
|-
|||1849||1935|| Great Britain|| || || Winner of 2 Grand Slam titles → 1879 and 1880 Wimbledon champion, 1881 runner-up
|-
|||1899||1990|| Australia|| || || Winner of 1 Grand Slam title → 1926 Australasian champion • 1928 French Championships semifinalist 
|-
|||1841||1915|| Great Britain|| || || 1877 Wimbledon All-Comers semifinalist
|-
|||1915||1943||/ Germany|| || || Winner of 1 Grand Slam title → 1937 French champion • 1938, 1939 Wimbledon semifinalist
|-
|||1974||–|| Great Britain|| || 4 || 1998, 1999, 2001 and 2002 Wimbledon semifinalist • 2004 French Open semifinalist • 2004 U.S. Open semifinalist • ranking in 2002
|-
|||1900||1981|||| || 8 || Ranking in 1927 and 1928 
|-
|||1940||–|| Australia/ South Africa|| || 6 || 1960, 1962 and 1963 Australian semifinalist • ranking amateur, 1967
|-
|||1981||–|| Australia|| 2022 || 1 || Winner of 2 Grand Slam titles → 2001 U.S. Open champion • 2002 Wimbledon champion • 2001/2002 Tour Finals champion • ranking no. 1 for 80 weeks
|-
|||1953||–|||| || 6 || 1982 and 1983 French Open semifinalist, 1977 and 1979 quarterfinalist – ranking in 1983
|-
|||1964||–|| Switzerland|| || 22 || 1991 French Open quarterfinalist • ranking in 1985
|-
|||1934||1994|| Australia|| 1980 || 1 || Winner of 4 Grand Slam titles → 1956 and 1957 Wimbledon champion • 1956 French champion • 1956 Australian champion • ranking world no. 1 amateur for 2 years, 1953, 1956. ranking world no. 1 professional 1959 Ampol points
|-
|||1870||1930|||| || || 1891, 1905 U.S. Championships finalist • 1898 Wimbledon semifinalist
|-
|||1968||–|| Sweden|| || 17 || Ranking in 1993
|-
|||1938||–|||| || 7 || 1959 U.S. Championships semifinalist • 1961 French Championships quarterfinalist • ranking in 1960
|-
|||1963||–|||| || 22 || Ranking in 1985
|-
|||1958||–|||| || 17 || Ranking in 1982
|-
|||1906||1985|| || 1978 || || 1930, 1931 and 1932 Australian Championships finalist 
|-
|||1868||1945|||| 1974 || || 1895 United States champion, 1896 finalist
|-
|||1978||–|| Slovakia|| || 12 || 1999 French Open semifinalist • ranking in 2004
|-
|||1950||–|| Czechoslovakia|| || 25 || Ranking in 1974
|-
|||1902||1997|| Great Britain|| || || 1931 French Championships semifinalist
|-
|||1998||–|||| || 25 || Ranking in 2021
|-
|||1919||1945|||| 1966 || || Winner of 1 Grand Slam title → 1943 U.S. champion
|-
|||1894||1981|||| 1961 || || 1923 Wimbledon finalist • 1928 and 1929 United States finalist
|-
|||1997||–|| Poland|| || 9 || 2021 Wimbledon semifinalist • ranking in 2021
|- id=I
|||1985||–|||| || 8 || 2018 Wimbledon semifinalist • 2011/2018 U.S. Open quarterfinalist • ranking in 2018
|-
|||1971||–|| Yugoslavia /  Croatia|| || 2 || Winner of 1 Grand Slam title → 2001 Wimbledon champion • 1996 U.S. Open semifinalist • ranking in 1994
|- id=J
|||1879||1977|| India|| || || 1925 French Championships semifinalist, 1925 Wimbledon quarterfinalist
|-
|||1964||–|| Argentina|| || 10 || 1985 French Open quarterfinalist • ranking in 1990
|-
|||1990||–|| Poland|| || 14 || 2013 Wimbledon semifinalist • ranking in 2013
|-
|||1942||–|||| || 20 || 1974 French Open semifinalist • 1966 French Championships semifinalist • ranking in 1974
|-
|||1961||–|| Sweden|| || 5 || 1985 Wimbledon semifinalist • ranking in 1985
|-
|||1982||–|| Sweden|| || 9 || 2004 U.S. Open semifinalist • ranking in 2005
|-
|||1975||–|| Sweden|| || 7 || Winner of 1 Grand Slam title → 2002 Australian Open champion • 2005 Wimbledon semifinalist • 1998/2000 US Open quarterfinalist • ranking in 2002
|-
|||1989||–|||| || 21 || Ranking in 2016 • 2016 Olympics quarterfinalist
|-
|||1894||1946|||| 1958 || 1 || Winner of 3 Grand Slam titles → 1915 and 1919 United States champion • 1923 Wimbledon champion (results incomplete as tournament drawsheets unavailable) • co-ranking world no. 1 for 1919 
|-
|||1939||–|| Yugoslavia|| || || 1968 French Open quarterfinalist
|- id=K
|||1974||–|| Russia|| 2019 || 1 || Winner of 2 Grand Slam titles and 1 Olympic gold medal → 1996 French Open champion • 1999 Australian Open champion • 2000 Olympic gold medalist • ranking no. 1 for 6 weeks, in 1999 
|-
|||1993||-|| Russia|| || 14 || 2021 Australian Open semifinalist • ranking in 2021
|-
|||1968||–|||| || 22 || 1996 French Open quarterfinalist • 1996 U.S. Open quarterfinalist • ranking in 1995
|-
|||1979||–|||| || 14 || 2009 Wimbledon quarterfinalist • Ranking in 2008
|-
|||1891||1937|| Hungary|| || || 1926/1929 French Championships quarterfinalist • 1929 Wimbledon quarterfinalist
|-
|||1996||–|| Russia || || 8 || 2023 Australian Open semifinalist • 2022 U.S. Open semifinalist • 2019 French Open quarterfinalist • Ranking in 2019
|-
|||1977||–|||| || 4 || 2006 Australian Open semifinalist • 1997 Wimbledon quarterfinalist • 2000 U.S. Open quarterfinalist • 1999 Tour Finals semifinalist • Ranking in 2000
|-
|||1899||1966|||| || || 1926 Wimbledon finalist
|-
|||1888||1964|| Great Britain|| || || Winner of 1 Grand Slam title → 1919 Australian champion • 1919 Wimbledon finalist
|-
|||1911||1994|| South Africa|| || || 1934 U.S. Championships semifinalist • 1934 Wimbledon quarterfinalist
|-
|||1989||–|| Slovakia|| || 24 || Ranking in 2015
|-
|||1863||1917|| United States|| || || 1885, 1890 U.S. Championships finalist
|-
|||1935||–|| Great Britain|| || || 1959 French quarterfinalist
|-
|||1945||–|| Brazil|| || 24 || 1969 French Open quarterfinalist • ranking in 1974 
|-
|||1946||–|| Czechoslovakia|| 1990 || || Winner of 3 Grand Slam titles → 1970 and 1971 French Open champion • 1973 Wimbledon champion
|-
|||1983||–|||| || 16 || 2012 Wimbledon quarterfinalist • ranking in 2012
|-
|||1968||–|| Czechoslovakia /  Czech Republic|| || 2 || Winner of 1 Grand Slam title → 1998 Australian Open champion • ranking in 1998
|-
|||1977||–|| Austria|| || 20 || 2002 Australian Open quarterfinalist • ranking in 2000
|-
|||1904||1979|| Czechoslovakia|| || || 1926 and 1927 Wimbledon quarterfinalist
|-
|||1895||1950|| Czechoslovakia|| 2006 || || Rated professional world no. 1 for four years, 1926, 1927, 1928 and 1929
|-
|||1971||–|| Netherlands|| || 4 || Winner of 1 Grand Slam title → 1996 Wimbledon champion • ranking in 1999
|-
|||1921||2009|||| 1968 || || Winner of 3 Grand Slam titles → 1946 and 1947 United States champion • 1947 Wimbledon champion • rated world no. 1 for 5 years → 1947, 1948, 1949, 1950 and 1951
|-
|||1887||1968|| Germany||  || || 1913 Wimbledon semifinalist • 1912 Olympic bronze medalist 
|-
|||1967||–|||| || 6 || 1989 U.S. Open semifinalist • 1995 Australian Open semifinalist • ranking in 1990
|-
|||1958||–|| South Africa/|| || 7 || Winner of 2 Grand Slam titles → 1981 and 1982 Australian Open champion • ranking in 1984
|-
|||1937||–|| India|| || || 1960 and 1961 Wimbledon semifinalist
|-
|||1961||–|| India|| || 23 || 1981 and 1987 U.S. Open quarterfinalist • 1986 Wimbledon quarterfinalist • ranking in 1985
|-
|||1954||–|| Australia|| || || 1978 Australian Open quarterfinalist
|-
|||1982||–|| Poland|| || || 2013 Wimbledon quarterfinalist
|-
|||1976||–|| Brazil|| 2012 || 1|| Winner of 3 Grand Slam titles → 1997/2000/2001 French Open champion • 2000 Tennis Masters Cup champion • ranking no. 1 for 43 weeksin 2000–2001
|-
|||1974||–|||| || 6 || 1998 Australian Open semifinalist • ranking in 1998
|-
|||1971||–|| Sweden|| || || 1992 French Open quarterfinalist
|-
|||1890||1968|||| || || 1918 U.S. Championships semifinalist • 1920 Olympics silver medalist
|-
|||1995||–|| Australia|| || 13 || 2022 Wimbledon finalist • 2022 U.S. Open quarterfinalist • 2015 Australian Open quarterfinalist • 2014 Wimbledon quarterfinalist • Ranking in 2016
|- id=L
|||1904||1996|||| 1976 || 1|| Winner of 7 Grand Slam titles → 1925, 1927 and 1929 French champion, 1926 and 1928 finalist • 1925 and 1928 Wimbledon champion, 1924 finalist, 1927 semifinalist • 1926 and 1927 United States champion • rated world no. 1 for 2 years
|-
|||1990||–|| Serbia|| || 23 || Ranking in 2019
|-
|||1976||–|| Ecuador|| || 6 || 1999 Australian Open semifinalist • ranking in 1999
|-
|||1872||1926|| United States|| 1956 || || Winner of 7 Grand Slam titles → 1901, 1902, 1907, 1908, 1909, 1910 and 1911 United States champion, 1900 and 1903 finalist • rated world no. 1 for 5 years → 1901 and 1902 (co-rated), 1908, 1909 and 1910
|-
|||1925||2012|| United States|| 1969 || || Winner of 1 Grand Slam title → 1950 United States champion, 1954 finalist
|-
|||1970||–|| Sweden|| || 10 || 1994 French Open semifinalist • ranking in 1995
|-
|||1938||–|| Australia|| 1981 || || Winner of 11 Grand Slam titles → 1960 and 1962 Australian champion; 1969 Australian Open champion • 1962 French champion; 1969 French Open champion, 1968 finalist • 1961, 1962, 1968 and 1969 Wimbledon champion • 1962 United States champion; 1969 U.S. Open champion • 1970 Masters Grand Prix finalist • rated world no. 1 for 7 years → 1964 (co-rated), 1965, 1966, 1967, 1968, 1969 and 1970 (co-rated) 
|-
|||1851||1925|| Great Britain|| 2006 || || Winner of 1 Grand Slam title → 1887 Wimbledon champion, 1880, 1884, 1885, 1886 and 1888 finalist, 1878, 1881 and 1882 and All-Comers semifinalist
|-
|||1963||–|||| || 5 || 1988 French Open finalist • ranking in 1986
|-
|||1907||1998|| Great Britain||  || || 1933 French Championships semifinalist
|-
|||1960||–|| Czechoslovakia/|| 2001 || 1 || winner of 8 Grand Slam titles → 1984, 1986 and 1987 French Open champion • 1985, 1986 and 1987 U.S. Open champion • 1989 and 1990 Australian Open champion • 1981, 1982, 1985, 1986 and 1987 Masters Grand Prix champion • ranking no. 1 for 270 weeks → 17 weeks in 1983, 15 in 1984, 17 in 1985, 52 in 1986, 52 in 1987, 37 in 1988, 48 in 1989 and 32 in 1990
|-
|||1867||1930|| Great Britain|| ||  || 1886, 1888, 1892, 1894 Wimbledon finalist
|-
|||1957||–|||| || 19 || 1983 Wimbledon finalist • ranking in 1979
|-
|||1979||–|| Croatia|| || 3 || 2006 French Open semifinalist • ranking in 2006
|-
|||1980||–|||| || 21 || Ranking in 2011
|-
|||1954||–|| Great Britain|| || || 1977 (December) Australian Open finalist
|-
|||1981||–|||| || 12 || 2005/2008/2011 Wimbledon quarterfinalist • 2015 US Open quarterfinalist • ranking in 2015
|-
|||1906||1991|||| 1964 || || 1931 United States finalist 
|-
|||1884||1972|| Great Britain|| || || Winner of 1 Grand Slam title → 1915 Australian champion • 1911, 1923 Wimbledon semifinalist
|-
|||1983||–|| Chinese Taipei|| || || 2010 Wimbledon quarterfinalist
|-
|||1965||–|| Sweden|| || 25 || Ranking in 1987
|-
|||1937||–|| Sweden|| || 3 || 1961, 1964 French Championships semifinalist • ranking in 1964
|-
|||1949||–|||| || 7 || 1970 Australian Open semifinalist • ranking in 1972
|-
|||1886||1935|| Great Britain|| || || 1922 Wimbledon finalist, 1905 Australian semifinalist
|-
|||1906||1963|| Great Britain|| || || 1930, 1932 French Championships quarterfinalist
|- id=M
|||1935||2012|||| || || 1959 Wimbledon semifinalist • 1959 Australian semifinalist 
|-
|||1867||1905|| Great Britain|| || || Winner of 1 Grand Slam title → 1896 Wimbledon champion • 1900 Olympics silver medalist
|-
|||1916||2013|| United States|| 1973 || 9 || 1938 United States finalist • ranking in 1938
|-
|||1980||–|| Belgium|| || 19 || 2002 Wimbledon semifinalist • ranking in 2002 
|-
|||1916||1960|| Switzerland|| || || 1936 French Championships quarterfinalist
|-
|||1965||–|| Israel|| || 18 || 1992 Australian Open quarterfinalist • ranking in 1987
|-
|||1969||–|| Argentina|| || 8 || 1989 French Open quarterfinalist • ranking in 1989
|-
|||1907||1978|| United States|| || || 1928, 1930, 1933, 1935, 1926 U.S. Championships quarterfinalist • 1930 Wimbledon quarterfinalist • 1933 French Championships quarterfinalist
|-
|||1988||–|||| || 22 || Ranking in 2018
|-
|||1956||–|||| || || 1981 U.S. Open quarterfinalist
|-
|||1974||–|||| || 10 || 1998 French Open semifinalist • ranking in 1998
|-
|||1952||–|| Australia|| ||  || 1978 Australian Open finalist
|-
|||1849||1921|| Great Britain|| ||  ||  1877 Wimbledon runner-up
|-
|||1956||–|||| ||  || 1977 Wimbledon quarterfinalist 
|-
|||1970||–|||| || 4 || 1994 Australian Open finalist • 1999 U.S. Open finalist • ranking in 1999
|-
| ||1979||–|| Chile|| || 9 || Winner of 2 Olympic gold medals ◌ 2004 Olympic gold medalist • ranking in 2004
|-
|||1950||–|| Australia|| ||  || 1974 Australian Open quarterfinalist
|-
|||1963||–|| Australia|| ||  15  ||  1987 Australian Open semifinalist • 1993 U.S. Open semifinalist • ranking in 1993
|-
|||1982||–|||| || 12 || Ranking in 2008
|-
|||1967||–|||| ||  || 1995 Wimbledon quarterfinalist
|-
|||1958||–|| West Germany|| || 24 || Ranking in 1986
|-
|||1883||1941|| Great Britain|| ||  ||  1909/1914/1920 Wimbledon semifinalist
|-
|||1983||–|||| || 18 || 2004/2012 Wimbledon quarterfinalist • ranking in 2011
|-
|||1956||–|||| || 4  || 1980 and 1982 Wimbledon quarterfinalist • 1982 and 1984 U.S. Open quarterfinalist • ranking in 1980 
|-
|||1987||–|| Argentina|| || 21 || Ranking in 2015
|-
|||1952||–|||| || 7 || 1973 Wimbledon semifinalist • ranking in 1982 
|-
|||1960||–|||| || 7 || 1983 Australian Open semifinalist • 1982 Wimbledon semifinalist • ranking in 1988
|-
|||1959||–|||| 1999 || || Winner of 7 Grand Slam titles → 1979, 1980, 1981 and 1984 U.S. Open champion • 1981, 1983 and 1984 Wimbledon champion • 1978, 1983 and 1984 Masters Grand Prix champion • ranking no. 1 for 170 weeks → 4 weeks in 1980, 23 in 1981, 45 in 1982, 26 in 1983, 37 in 1984, 35 in 1985 • ranking no. 1 for 267 weeks → 37 weeks in 1979, 52 in 1980, 41 in 1981, 48 in 1982, 52 in 1983, 37 in 1984
|-
|||1966||–|||| || || 1991 Australian Open semifinalist
|-
|||1916||1978|| Australia|| || || Winner of 1 Grand Slam title → 1927 Australian champion
|-
|||1929||2007|| Australia|| 1999 || 3 || Winner of 1 Grand Slam title → 1952 Australian champion • ranking in 1952
|-
|||1941||1986|||| 1986 || 2 || Winner of 1 Grand Slam title → 1963 Wimbledon champion  • ranking in 1963
|-
|||1890||1957|| United States|| 1957 || 1 || Winner of 2 Grand Slam titles → 1912 and 1913 United States champion, 1911, 1914 and 1915 finalist • 1913 Wimbledon finalist (results likely incomplete as most drawsheets are unavailable) • rated world no. 1 for 1 year, 1914 
|-
|||1955||2019|| Australia|| || 7 || 1980 Australian Open semifinalist • ranking in 1983 
|-
|||1954||–|| Australia|| || 24 || Ranking in 1986
|-
|||1918||1996|||| 1965 || || Winner of 2 Grand Slam titles → 1939 French champion, 1940 United States champion
|-
|||1942||–|| South Africa|| 1992 ||  || Quarterfinalist 1972 US Open
|-
|||1964||–|| Czechoslovakia|| || 4 || 1988 Olympic gold medalist • 1986 US Open finalist • 1989 Australian Open finalist  • ranking in 1988
|-
|||1974||–|| Soviet Union /  Ukraine|| || 4 || 1999 French Open finalist • ranking in 1994
|-
|||1996||–|| Russia || || 2 || 2021 US Open Champion • 2020 Tour finals champion • 2019 US Open Finalist • 2021/2022 Australian Open Finalist • 2020 US Open semifinalist • Ranking in 2021 • World no. 1 for 16 weeks (2022)
|-
|||1848||1928|| Great Britain||  || || 1889 U.S. Championships semifinalist • 1895 Wimbledon semifinalist
|-
|||1949||2014|| West Germany|| || 20 || Ranking in 1973
|-
|||1971||–|| Brazil|| || 25 || 1999 French Open semifinalist • ranking in 1999
|-
|||1981||–|| Austria|| || 8 || 2010 French Open semifinalist • ranking in 2011
|-
|||1907||1987|| Czechoslovakia||  || || 1938 French Championships finalist 
|-
|||1927||2019|| Italy|| || || 1955, 1956 French Championships semifinalist
|-
|||1944||–|| Soviet Union|| || || 1972 French Open semifinalist • 1972 Australian Open semifinalist
|-
|||1977||–|| Belarus|| || 18 || 2002 US Open quarterfinalist • ranking in 2003 
|-
|||1917||1986|| Yugoslavia||  || || 1938, 1946, 1949 French Championships quarterfinalist
|-
|||1984||–|| Argentina|| || 10 || Ranking in 2012
|-
|||1986||–|||| || 6 || 2008 French Open semifinalist • 2016 US Open semifinalist • ranking in 2016
|-
|||1980||–|||| || 22 || Ranking in 2010
|-
|||1904||1976|| Australia|| || || 1930 Australian champion
|-
|||1946||–|| South Africa|| || || 1977 US Open quarterfinalist
|-
|||1920||2006|| Argentina|| || || 1953, 1954 French Championships semifinalist
|-
|||1896||1961|| Italy|| || || 1930 French Championships semifinalist
|-
|||1955||–|| Great Britain|| || 15 || Ranking in 1983
|-
|||1976||–|||| || 1|| Winner of 1 Grand Slam title → 1998 French Open champion • 1998 Tour Finals finalist, 1997/2002 semifinalist • ranking world no. 1 for 2 weeks in 1999
|-
|||1940||–|| Australia|| || || 1962 Wimbledon finalist
|-
|||1913||2016|| United States|| 1972 || 7 || 1952 U.S. finalist  • ranking in 1952
|-
|||1983||–|| Luxembourg|| || || 2008 U.S. Open quarterfinalist
|-
|||1987||–|| Great Britain|| || 1|| Winner of 3 Grand Slam titles → 2012 US Open champion •2013 and 2016 Wimbledon Champion • 2016 Tour Finals champion • winner of 2 Olympic gold medals → 2012 and 2016 Olympic gold medalist • ranking world no. 1 for 41 weeks (2016–17)
|-
|||1892||1970|| United States|| 1958 || || 1917/1918 U.S. champion
|-
|||1967||–|| Austria|| || 1 || Winner of 1 Grand Slam title → 1995 French Open champion • ranking world no. 1 for 6 weeks
|- id=N
|||1986||–|||| || 1 || Winner of 22 Grand Slam titles including a career Grand Slam achieved in 2010 and 2 Olympic gold medals → 2005/2006/2007/2008/2010/2011/2012/2013/2014/2017/2018/2019/2020/2022 French Open champion (14) • 2008/2010 Wimbledon champion (2) • 2010/2013/2017/2019 US Open champion (4) • 2009/2022 Australian Open champion • 2010/2013 Tour Finals finalist, 2006/2007/2015/2020 semifinalist • 2008 Olympic single gold medalist • world no. 1 for 209 weeks (2008–2020)
|-
|||1982||–|| Argentina|| || 3 || 2002 Wimbledon finalist • 2005 Tour Finals champion, 2006 semifinalist • ranking in 2006
|-
|||1946||–|| Romania|| 1991 || 1 || Winner of 2 Grand Slam titles → 1972 US Open champion • 1973 French Open champion • 1971/1972/1973/1975 Masters champion, 1974 finalist • ranking world no. 1 for 40 weeks and for 1973
|-
|||1873||1949|| United States|| || || 1895, 1896 U.S. Championships semifinalist
|-
|||1944||–|| Australia|| 1986 || 1|| Winner of 7 Grand Slam titles → 1967/1970/1971 Wimbledon champion • 1967/1973 US Open champion • 1973/1975 Australian Open champion • ranking world no. 1
|-
|||1930||2011|| Denmark|| || || 1953/1955 Wimbledon finalist
|-
|||1981||–|| Finland|| || 13 || 2005 U.S. Open quarterfinalist • 2006 Wimbledon quarterfinalist • 2008 Australian Open quarterfinalist • ranking in 2006
|-
|||1886||1932|| United States|| || || 1917 U.S. Championships finalist
|-
|||1873||1937|| Great Britain|| || || 1897 U.S. Championships finalist
|-
|||1989||–|||| || 4 || 2014 US Open finalist • 2012/2015/2016/2019 Australian Open quarterfinalist • 2015/2017/2019 French Open quarterfinalist • 2018/2019 Wimbledon quarterfinalist • 2014,2016 Tour finals semifinalist • 2016 Olympic bronze medalist • ranking in 2015
|-
|||1960||–|||| 2005 || 3 || Winner of 1 Grand Slam title → 1983 French Open champion • ranking in 1986
|-
|||1976||–|| Sweden|| || 2 || 2000 French Open finalist • Ranking in 2000
|-
|Cameron Norrie
|1996
|_
|
|
|12
|Ranking in 2021
|-
|||1899||1956|| South Africa||  || || 1921 Wimbledon finalist 
|-
|||1965||–|| Czechoslovakia /  Czech Republic|| || ||  1994 US Open semifinalist • 1987/1993 French Open quarterfinalist
|-
|||1975||–|| Czech Republic|| || 5 || 2002 Australian Open semifinalist • ranking in 2002
|-
|||1910||1991|| /  Germany|| 2006 ||
|-
|||1963||–|| Sweden|| || 7 || Ranking in 1986
|-
|- id=O
|||1944||–|||| || || 1968 US Open finalist, 1971 semifinalist • 1969 French Open semifinalist, 1973 quarterfinalist • 1971 Australian Open semifinalist, 1970 quarterfinalist • 1978 Wimbledon semifinalist, 1968/1969/1975/1979 quarterfinalist 
|-
|||1936||2020|| Peru / || 1987 || || Winner of 2 Grand Slam titles → 1959 Australian champion • 1959 Wimbledon champion • 1959 U.S. finalist
|-
|||1997||–|||| || 23 || Ranking in 2021
|-
|||1949||–||/|| 2012 || || Winner of 1 Grand Slam title → 1975 US Open champion, 1976/1977 quarterfinalist • 1974 French Open finalist, 1972 semifinalist, 1976/1978 quarterfinalist • 1972 Wimbledon semifinalist • 1968 Australian Open quarterfinalist • 1976 Masters champion
|-
|||1945||–|||| || || 1971 U.S. Open quarterfinalist
|-
|||1938||1969|||| 1979 || 1|| Winner of 1 Grand Slam title → 1963 U.S. Open champion • ranking no. 1 in 1963
|- id=P
|||1921||1986|| Australia|| || || Winner of 1 Grand Slam title → 1946 Australian champion, 1947 finalist • 1947 Wimbledon semifinalist, 1946 quarterfinalist
|-
|||1989||–|||| || 18 || Ranking in 2016
|-
|||1912||1994|| Yugoslavia|| || || 1938 French Championships semifinalist
|-
|||1936||–|||| || || 1965 U.S. Championships quarterfinalist
|-
|||1950||–|| Italy|| || 4 || Winner of 1 Grand Slam title → 1976 French Open champion • 1976 Davis Cup champion • ranking in 1976
|-
|||1870||1952|||| || || 1899 U.S. Championships finalist
|-
|||1881||1946|| Great Britain|| || || Winner of 1 Grand Slam title → 1912 Australian champion
|-
|||1916||1997|| United States|| 1966 || || Winner of 4 Grand Slam titles → 1944, 1945 U.S. champion, 1948, 1949 French champion • 1937 Wimbledon semifinalist
|-
|||1847||1928|| Great Britain|| || || 1879 Wimbledon All-Comers semifinalist
|-
|||1947||–|||| || || 1973 Australian Open finalist 
|-
|||1944||–|||| 2013 || || 1965 U.S. quarterfinalist • 1976 Wimbledon quarterfinalist
|-
|||1962||–|||| || 18 || Ranking in 1987
|-
|||1895||1967|| Australia|| 1989 || || Rated co-world no. 1 in 1919 with "Little Bill" Johnston
|-
|||1949||–|||| || 24 || Ranking in 1974
|-
|||1924||2021|||| 1977 || 1|| Winner of 2 Grand Slam titles → 1950 French champion • 1950 Wimbledon champion  • ranking in 1950
|-
|||1974||–|| Romania|| || 13 || 2002 French Open quarterfinalist • ranking in 2004
|-
|||1955||–|| Paraguay|| || 9 || Ranking in 1980
|-
|||1879||1967|| United States|| 1966 || || 1915 United States semifinalist
|-
|||1990||–|| Argentina|| || 20 || Ranking in 2019 • 2019 Wimbledon quarterfinalist
|-
|||1917||1974|||| || || 1946 Wimbledon quarterfinalist
|-
|||1969||–|| Argentina|| || 13 || Ranking in 1988
|-
|||1963||–|| Sweden|| || 10 || 1986 French Open finalist • 1990 Australian Open quarterfinalist • ranking in 1986
|-
|||1909||1995|| Great Britain|| 1975 || 1|| Winner of 8 Grand Slam titles, including a Career Slam → 1933/1934/1936 U.S. champion • 1934/1935/1936 Wimbledon champion • 1934 Australian champion • 1935 French champion • rated world no. 1 for 5 years
|-
|||1916||1984||||2016|| || Winner of 1 Grand Slam title → 1946 Wimbledon champion
|-
|||1953||–|||| || 19 || 1978/1981/1982 Australian Open semifinalist • ranking in 1983
|-
|||1976||–|| Australia|| || 8 || 1998 US Open finalist • 2003 Wimbledon finalist • ranking in 1999
|-
|||1937||–|| Australia|| || || 1968 Australian Championships semifinalist
|-
|||1933||–|| Italy|| 1986 || 3 || Winner of 2 Grand Slam titles → 1959 and 1960 French Open champion • ranking in 1959
|-
|||1939||–|| Yugoslavia|| || || 1973 French Open finalist
|-
|||1869||1942|| Ireland|| || || Winner of 2 Grand Slam titles → 1893, 1894 Wimbledon champion
|-
|||1963||–|| Czechoslovakia|| || 21 || Ranking in 1985
|-
|||1954||–|| West Germany|| || 23 || Ranking in 1979
|-
|||1969||–|||| || || 1993 US Open finalist • 1997 Wimbledon finalist • 1998 French Open semifinalist
|-
|||1947||–|||| || || 1974 French Open quarterfinalist
|-
|||1976||–|||| || || 2000/2003 Wimbledon quarterfinalist
|-
|||1990||-|||| || 25 || 2015 Wimbledon quarterfinalist • ranking in 2014
|-
|||1994||-|||| || 10 || 2016 Wimbledon quarterfinalist • 2016 U.S. Open quarterfinalist • Ranking in 2018
|-
|||1964||–|| Croatia|| || 16 || 1991 Australian Open quarterfinalist • 1993 French Open quarterfinalist • Ranking in 1991
|-
|||1949||–|||| || 23 || 1973 French Open finalist • Ranking in 1973
|-
|||1978||–|| Argentina|| || 9 || 2005 French Open finalist • Ranking in 2005
|-
|||1913||1985|| Yugoslavia|| || || 1938 French Championships semifinalist • 1938/1939 Wimbledon semifinalist
|-
|||1959||–|||| || 21 || Ranking in 1980
|- id=Q
|||1987||–|||| || 11 || 2017 Wimbledon semifinalist • 2017 U.S. Open quarterfinalist • Ranking in 2018
|-
|||1913||1991|| Australia|| 1984 || || Winner of 3 Grand Slam titles → 1936/1940/1948 Australian champion 
|- id=R
|||1972||–|| Australia|| 2006 || 1|| Winner of 2 Grand Slam titles → 1997/1998 U.S. Open champion • 2000/2001 Wimbledon finalist • 1997 French Open semifinalist • 2001 Australian Open semifinalist • Ranking world no. 1 for 1 week
|-
|||1942||2020|||| 1987 || 5 || 1966 Wimbledon finalist • Ranking in 1966
|-
|||1953||–|| Mexico|| || 4 || Ranking in 1976 
|-
|||1988||–|||| || 17 || French Open quarterfinalist • Ranking in 2016
|-
|||1990||–|||| || 3 || 2016 Wimbledon finalist • 2016 Tour Finals semifinalist • Ranking in 2016
|-
|||1895||1962|| South Africa|| || || 1924 Wimbledon semifinalist • 1920 Olympic gold medalist
|-
|||1965||–|||| || 20 || Ranking in 1991 
|-
|||1958||–|||| || || 1980 Australian Open quarterfinalist
|-
|||1861||1899|| Great Britain|| 1983 || || Winner of 1 Grand Slam title → 1888 Wimbledon champion 
|-
|||1861||1904|| Great Britain|| 1983 || || Winner of 7 Grand Slam titles → 1881/1882/1883/1884/1885/1886/1889 Wimbledon champion
|-
|||c.1921||1992|| United States|| || || 1942 U.S. National Championships quarterfinalist
|-
|||1903||1959|| United States|| 1961 || || 1924 Olympic gold medalist
|-
|||1946||–|||| || 16 || 1970/1972 U.S. Open semifinalist • Ranking in 1973
|-
|||1918||1995|| United States|| 1967 || || Winner of 3 Grand Slam titles → 1939 Wimbledon champion • 1939/1941 U.S. champion •  Ranked world no. 1 for 3 years
|-
|||1941||–|||| || 11 || 1971 Australian Open quarterfinalist • 1971 U.S. Open quarterfinalist • Ranking in 1974
|-
|||1975||–|| Chile|| || 1|| 1998 Australian Open finalist • Ranking world no. 1 for 6 weeks in 1998
|-
|||1877||1959|| Great Britain|| || || 1903(Ch)/1904(Ch)/1906(Ch) Wimbledon finalist
|-
|||1870||1955|| Great Britain|| || || 1902/1903/1904/1909(Ch) Wimbledon finalist • 1908 Olympic outdoor gold medalist
|-
|||1982||–|||| || 5 || 2007 Australian Open quarterfinalist • 2003/2005/2007/2009/2013 French Open quarterfinalist • 2013 U.S. Open quarterfinalist • Ranking in 2006
|-
|||1945||–|| Australia|| 1986 || 2 || 1966 French champion • Ranking in 1969
|-
|||1981||–|| Belgium|| || 24 || Ranking in 2005
|-
|||1982||–||||2017|| 1 || Winner of 1 Grand Slam title • 2003 U.S. Open champion • 2003/2004/2007 Masters semifinalist • Ranking world no. 1 for 13 weeks in 2003–2004
|-
|||1957||–|||| || || 1983 French Open semifinalist
|-
|||1930||2017|| Australia|| 2001 || 3 || Winner of 2 Grand Slam titles • 1954 Australian champion • 1958 French champion • Ranking in 1958
|-
|||1934||–|| Australia|| 1980 || 1 || Winner of 8 Grand Slam titles • 1953/1955/1971(O)/1972(O) Australian (Open) champion • 1953/1968(O) French (Open) champion • 1956/1970(O) US (Open) champion • Ranking in 1961
|-
|||1970||–|| Switzerland|| || 9 || 1992 Olympic gold medalist • 1996 French Open semifinalist • Ranking in 1995
|-
|||1965||–|||| || 13 || 1988 U.S. Open quarterfinalist • Ranking in 1991
|-
|||1997||–|| Russia|| || 5 || 2017/2020/2022 U.S. Open quarterfinalist • 2020 French Open quarterfinalist • 2021 Australian Open quarterfinalist • 2022 Tour Finals semifinalist • Ranking in 2021 
|-
|||1946||–|| Australia|| || || 1969/1975 Australian Open semifinalist
|-
|||2003||–|| Denmark|| || 9 || 2022 French Open quarterfinalist • Ranking in 2023
|-
|||1973||–|| Great Britain|| || 4 || 1997 U.S. Open finalist • Ranking in 1997
|-
|||1916||1977|| Argentina|| || || 1942/1945 U.S. National Championships quarterfinalist
|-
|||1998||–|| Norway|| || 2 || 2022 U.S. Open finalist • 2022 French Open finalist • Ranking in 2022
|- id=S
|||1978||–|| Brazil|| || || 2002 Wimbledon quarterfinalist
|-
|||1956||–|||| || 14 || Ranking in 1980
|-
|||1980||–|| Russia||2016|| 1|| Winner of 2 Grand Slam titles → 2000 US Open champion • 2005 Australian Open champion • 2000/2004 Masters semifinalist • Ranking world no. 1 for 9 weeks
|-
|||1971||–|||| 2007 || 1 || Winner of 14 Grand Slam titles → 1990/1993/1995/1996/2002 US Open champion • 1993/1994/1995/1997/1998/1999/2000 Wimbledon champion • 1994/1997 Australian Open champion • 1991/1994/1996/1997/1999 Masters champion (record; shared with Ivan Lendl) • Ranking world no. 1 for 286 weeks
|-
|||1965||–|||| || 7 || 1988 French Open quarterfinalist • 1988 U.S. Open quarterfinalist • Ranking in 1990
|-
|||1968||–|||| || 23 || 1991/1996 U.S. Open quarterfinalist • Ranking in 1994
|-
|||1991||–|||| || || 2018/2020 Australian Open quarterfinalist
|-
|||1938||2021|||| 1984 || 1 || Winner of 4 Grand Slam titles → 1961/1964 French champion • 1965 U.S. champion • 1966 Wimbledon champion • Ranking world no. 1 amateur in 1966 
|-
|||1972||–|||| || 17 || 2006 Australian Open quarterfinalist • Ranking in 2001 
|-
|||1908||1934|||| || 3 || 1931/1933 French championship semifinalist • 1932 Australian championship semifinalist • 1932/1933 Wimbledon semifinalist • Ranking in 1933
|-
|||1927||–|||| 1976 || 2 || Winner of 2 Grand Slam titles → 1951 Wimbledon champion • 1951 Australian champion • Ranking in 1951
|-
|||1956||2021|||| || 9 || Ranking in 1984
|-
|||1976||–|| Netherlands|| || 11 || 2002 U.S. Open semifinalist • Ranking in 2003
|-
|||1959||–|| Netherlands|| || 25 || 1985/1988 Australian Open quarterfinalist • Ranking in 1988
|-
|||1900||1968|| Australia || || || 1924/1929 Australian Championships finalist 
|-
|||1921||2006|||| 1966 || || Winner of 2 Grand Slam titles → 1942 U.S. champion • 1949 Wimbledon champion 
|-
|||1976||–|||| || 5 || 2003 Australian Open finalist • 2003 Masters semifinalist • Ranking in 2003
|-
|||1992||–|| Argentina|| || 8 || 2020 French Open semifinalist • 2017/2019 U.S. Open quarterfinalist • Ranking in 2020
|-
|||1861||1943|| United States|| 1955 || || Winner of 7 Grand Slam titles • 1881–1887 U.S. champion 
|-
|||1927||–|| Australia|| 1979 || 1 || Winner of 5 Grand Slam titles • 1949/1950 Australian champion • 1951/1952 U.S. champion • 1952 Wimbledon champion • Considered world no. 1 amateur for 1952
|-
|||1930||2016|| South Africa|| || || 1964 Wimbledon quarterfinalist
|-
|||1921||2017|||| 1984 || || 1942/1943/1944/1945/1946/1947 U.S. semifinalist • Considered world no. 1 professional for 1950/1952
|-
|||1923||–|||| 1971 || || Winner of 2 Grand Slam titles • 1953 Wimbledon champion • 1954 U.S. champion
|-
|||1984||–|| Italy|| || 18 || Ranking in 2013
|-
|||1999||–|||| || 10 || 2022 Australian Open quarterfinalist • 2020 U.S. Open quarterfinalist • Ranking in 2020
|-
|||1869||1960|| United States|| || || 1889 U.S Championships finalist
|-
|||1909||1975|||| 1964 || || 1930 U.S. Championships finalist • 1931 Wimbledon finalist
|-
|||1891||1977|||| || || 1920 Wimbledon (challenge round) finalist
|-
|||1920|| 2021|| Australia || || 10 || 1948–1950 Australian Championships semifinalist – Ranking in 1949
|-
|||1970||–|| Netherlands|| || 14 || 1998 Wimbledon quarterfinalist • Ranking in 1998
|-
|||1984||–|||| || 6 || 2009 Australian Open quarterfinalist • 2015 Wimbledon quarterfinalist • 2008 Masters semifinalist • Ranking in 2009
|-
|||2001||–|| Italy|| || 9 || 2022 U.S. Open quarterfinalist • 2020 French Open quarterfinalist • Ranking in 2021
|-
|||1928||1995|| Italy|| || || 1960 French Championships semifinalist 
|-
|||1906||1994|||| || || Ranked no. 2 in professional tennis in 1941
|-
|||1968||2008|| Austria|| || 18 || Ranking in 1990
|-
|||1862||1949|| United States|| 1955 || || Winner of 2 Grand Slam titles • 1888/1889 U.S. champion
|-
|||1955||–|| Czechoslovakia|| || 12 || Ranking in 1984
|-
|||1956||–|| Czechoslovakia|| || 11 || Ranking in 1984
|-
|||1946||–|||| 1987 || 1 || Winner of 2 Grand Slam titles • 1971 U.S. Open champion • 1972 Wimbledon champion • 1970 Masters champion • Ranking world no. 1 for 1972 (year-end)
|-
|||1872||1947|| Great Britain|| || || 1899/1900(Ch)/1905 Wimbledon finalist
|-
|||1992||-|||| || 8 || Ranking in 2017
|-
|||1984||–|| Sweden|| || 4 || 2009/2010 French Open finalist • 2009 Masters semifinalist • Ranking in 2010
|-
|||1952||–|||| || 5 || Ranking in 1980
|-
|||1995||–|| Italy|| || 23 || Ranking in 2021
|-
|||1974||–|||| || 18 || 1999 Australian Open quarterfinalist • Ranking in 2005
|-
|||1872||1947|| South Africa|| || || 1927 French Championships semifinalist
|-
|||1975||–|| Argentina|| || 11 || 2000 French Open semifinalist • Ranking in 2000
|-
|||1963||–|| Czechoslovakia|| || 23 || 1986 U.S. Open quarterfinalist • Ranking in 1986
|-
|||1979||–|| Thailand|| || 9 || Ranking in 2003
|-
|||1967||–||/|| || 14 || Ranking in 1990
|-
|||1904||1992|| Italy|| || || 1932 French Championships finalist
|-
|||1967||–|| Sweden|| || 23 || Ranking in 1987
|-
|||1978||–|| Czech Republic|| || 8 || 2006 Wimbledon quarterfinalist • Ranking in 2006
|-
|||1969||–|||| || || 1993 Australian Open quarterfinalist
|-
|||1968||–|||| 2018 || 2 || Winner of 1 Grand Slam title • 1991 Wimbledon champion • 1993 Masters champion
|-
|||1951||–|||| || || 1974 Wimbledon semifinalist 
|-
|||1911||1970|||| || || 1934 U.S. Championships semifinalist
|-
|||1938||–|| Australia|| 1985 || 2 || Winner of 2 Grand Slam titles • 1965 French champion• 1966 U.S. champion|-
|||1970||–|| Australia|| || 19 || 1996 Wimbledon semifinalist • Ranking in 1994
|-
|||1945||–|| Australia|| || || 1972 Australian Open semifinalist 
|-
|||1920||2004|| South Africa|| || 6 || 1947/1951 French Championships finalist, 1948 U.S. Championships finalist • Ranking in 1948
|-
|||1964||–|| Sweden|| || 6 || 1984 French Open quarterfinalist • Ranking in 1984
|-
|||1966||–|| Sweden|| || 10 || 1988 French Open semifinalist • Ranking in 1991
|-
|||1911||1976|| Hungary|| || || 1939 French Championships semifinalist
|- id=T
|||1918||1999|| United States|| 1967 || || 1944/1945 U.S. Championships finalist
|-
|||1951||–|||| || 4 || Winner of 1 Grand Slam title • 1977 Australian Open champion • Ranking in 1979
|-
|||1954||–|| Hungary|| || 13 || 1976/1981 French Open quarterfinalist • Ranking in 1982
|-
|||1865||1920|| United States|| || || 1884(Ch)/1886/1887/1888 U.S. Championships finalist
|-
|||1941||–|| United Kingdom|| || 11 || Ranking in 1973
|-
|||1954||–|||| || 7 || Winner of 1 Grand Slam title • 1980 Australian Open champion • Ranking in 1981
|-
|||1959||–|||| || 6 || Ranking in 1982
|-
|||1962||–|||| || 22 || Ranking in 1984
|-
|||1993||–|| Austria|| || 3 || 2020 U.S. Open Champion • 2020 Australian Open finalist • 2018/2019 French Open finalist • 2019/2020 Tour Finals finalist • Ranking in 2020
|-
|||1998||–|||| || 19 || 2022 U.S. Open semifinalist • 2019 Australian Open quarterfinalist • Ranking in 2022
|-
|||1893||1953|||| 1959 || 1 || Winner of 10 Grand Slam titles • 1920/1921/1922/1923/1924/1925/1929 U.S. champion • 1920/1921/1930 Wimbledon champion • 7 times world no. 1|-
|||1972||–|| Sweden|| || || 1996 Australian Open quarterfinalist
|-
|||1904||1998|| Netherlands|| || || 1927/1929 Wimbledon quarterfinalist 
|-
|||1984||–|| Serbia|| || 8 || 2011/2012 US Open quarterfinalist • Ranking in 2012
|-
|||1939||–|| Romania|| 2013 || || 1968 French Open quarterfinalist
|-
|||1911||2000|| Poland|| || || 1939 French Championships quarterfinalist
|-
|||1992||–|| Australia|| || 17 || 2011 Wimbledon quarterfinalist • Ranking in 2016
|-
|||1930||2021|||| 1970 || 1 || Winner of 5 Grand Slam titles • 1953/1955 U.S. champion • 1954/1955 French champion • 1955 Wimbledon champion • Ranking world number 1 amateur in 1953
|-
|||1986||–|| Serbia|| || 12 || Ranking in 2011
|-
|||1998||–|| Greece|| || 3 || 2021 French Open finalist • 2019/2021/2022 Australian Open semifinalist • 2019 Tour Finals champion • Ranking in 2021
|-
|||1985||–|||| || 5 || 2008 Australian Open finalist • 2011 Tour Finals finalist • ranking in 2012
|-
|||1963||–|||| || 10 || Ranking in 1986
|-
|||1982||–|||| || 20 || Ranking in 2006
|- id=V
|||1959||–|||| || 25 || Ranking in 1983
|-
|||1983||–|||| || 7 || 2009 Australian Open semifinalist • Ranking in 2009
|-
|||1978||–|| Netherlands|| || 14 || 2003 French Open finalist • Ranking in 2003
|-
|||1933||–|| South Africa|| || 10 || 1959 French Championships finalist • Ranking in 1959
|-
|||1925||–|| Brazil|| || || 1951 Wimbledon quarterfinalist
|-
|||1952||–|| Argentina|| 1991 || 2 || Winner of 4 Grand Slam titles • 1977 French Open champion • 1977 U.S. Open champion • 1978/1979 Australian Open champion • 1974 Masters champion|-
|||1911||1994|| United States|| 1962 || 1 || Winner of 3 Grand Slam titles • 1931/1932 U.S. Champion • 1932 Wimbledon Champion • Rated world no 1 for 4 years (1932/1935/1936/1937)
|-
|||1974||–|| Romania|| || || 1995 French Open quarterfinalist
|-
|||1981||–|| Italy|| || 25 || Ranking in 2007
|-
|||1967||2019||  Russia|| || 14 || 1993 US Open semifinalist • Ranking in 1994
|- id=W
|||1955||–|||| || || 1978 U.S. Open quarterfinalist
|-
|||1878||1961|||| 1956 || || Winner of 1 Grand Slam title • 1904 U.S. champion 
|-
|||1876||1914|||| || || 1897/1898/1899/1901 U.S. semifinalist 
|-
|||1952||–|||| || 15 || 1980 Australian Open finalist • Ranking in 1981
|-
|||1924||2015|| Belgium|| || || 1957 French Championships quarterfinalist
|-
|||1969||–|||| || 11 || 1996 Wimbledon finalist • 1994 Australian Open quarterfinalist • Ranking in 1992
|-
|||1985||–|||| || 3 || Winner of 3 Grand Slam singles titles • 2014 Australian Open champion • 2015 French Open champion • 2016 US Open champion • 2013/2014/2015 Tour Finals semifinalist • Ranking in 2014 
|-
|||1969||–|||| || 12 || 1991 Wimbledon semifinalist • Ranking in 1992
|-
|||1877||1932|||| 1955 || || Winner of 3 Grand Slam titles • 1898/1899/1900 US champion 
|-
|||1964||–|||| 2002 || 1|| Winner of 7 Grand Slam titles • 1982/1985/1988 French Open champion • 1983/1984/1988 Australian Open champion • 1988 U.S. Open champion • 1987 Masters finalist • Ranking world no. 1 for 20 weeks 
|-
|||1883||1915|||| 1978 || 1 || Winner of 6 Grand Slam titles → 1906/1909 Australian champion • 1910/1911/1912/1913 Wimbledon champion• Ranking in 1913
|-
|||1891||1968|||| || 5 || 1914, 1916 US champion • Ranking in 1913
|-
|||1959||–|||| || 23 || 1986 US Open quarterfinalist • Ranking in 1986
|-
|||1935||2020|| Great Britain|| || || 1958/1959/1961/1963 Wimbledon quarterfinalist • 1960/1963 U.S. National quarterfinalist • 1963 French Championships quarterfinalist
|-
|||1963||1998|||| || || 1988 Australian Open quarterfinalist
|-
|||1911||2009|||| 1964 ||  || Winner of 1 Grand Slam title → 1931 Wimbledon champion • 1935 U.S. Championships finalist 
|-
|||1971||–|||| 2010 || 19 || Ranking in 1997 
|-
|||1965||–|||| 2010 || 19 || Ranking in 1996 
|-
|||1973||–|||| || || 2000 Australian Open quarterfinalist
|-
|||1873||1925|||| 1955 || || Winner of 4 Grand Slam titles → 1893, 1894, 1896 and 1897 US champion  
|-
|||1865||1948|||| || || 1900 U.S. Championships finalist
|-
|||1879||1925|||| 1956 || || Winner of 1 Grand Slam title → 1905 US champion • Winner of 1 Olympic gold medal → 1904  
|- id=Y
|||1982||–|||| || 8 || 2006/2010 US Open semifinalist • Ranking in 2008
|-
|||1967||–|||| || 18 || 1991 Australian Open quarterfinalist • 1994 U.S. Open quarterfinalist • Ranking in 1989
|- id=Z
|||1978||–|| Argentina|| || 20 || 2001 U.S. Open quarterfinalist • Ranking in 2000
|-
|||1947||–|| Czechoslovakia|| || || 1973 Australian Open quarterfinalist
|-
|||1963||–|| Yugoslavia|| || 19 || 1985 Australian Open semifinalist • 1986 Wimbledon semifinalist • Ranking in 1987
|-
|||1997||–|||| || 2 || 2020 U.S. Open finalist • 2021/2022 French Open semifinalist • 2020 Australian Open semifinalist • 2018 Tour Finals champion' • Ranking in 2022
|-
|''||1987||–|||| || 25 || 2017 Australian Open quarterfinalist • Ranking in 2017
|}

See also

 List of male doubles tennis players
 List of female tennis players
 Lists of tennis players
 Lists of sportspeople
 List of ATP number 1 ranked singles tennis players
 World number 1 ranked male tennis players
 Top ten ranked male tennis players
 Top ten ranked male tennis players (1912–1972)
 List of Grand Slam men's singles champions

Notes

References